Senior Nehru Hockey Tournament is a field hockey tournament organized by the Jawaharlal Nehru Hockey Tournament Society (JNHTS). Instituted in 1964 by the Society, the All India Hockey Tournament is held as an annual feature at New Delhi.

History
The tournament was instituted by the Jawaharlal Nehru Hockey Tournament Society which was founded in 1964, in memorial of India's first Prime Minister Jawaharlal Nehru. The All India Tournament was co-founded by H.C. Sarin, Shri Sayed Hamid and Inder Mohan Kapur to organize a top-class domestic hockey tournament in the capital.

The first edition was held in December 1964, where Northern Railway defeated South Eastern Railway 2–0 in the final.

The Society also started tournaments for other age groups such as Junior Tournament in 1972 for under-17 youth, Sub-Junior Tournament in 1983 for under-15 youth, Girls’ Tournament in 1993 for under-17 girls and the Champion College/Universities Tournament in 1993 which is now known as Inter-University Tournament.

The early decade of the tournament during the 1960–1970s was dominated by the Railway teams, especially Northern Railway (Delhi), Western Railway (Mumbai) and South Eastern Railway (Secunderabad).

Venue
The matches are held at Shivaji Hockey Stadium, New Delhi. The 2021 edition was held at Hyderabad.

Teams
The teams which participates in the tournament consists of public sector teams from across the country. The teams in the 57th edition includes CAG XI Indian Audit & Accounts Service, Indian Air Force, Indian Navy, Indian Oil, Indian Railways, Mumbai XI, PNB, Telangana XI, South Central Railway, ADGPI, Indian Army, Delhi XI, Punjab & Sind Bank, RCF and Tamil Nadu XI.

Results
The results of the Senior Nehru Hockey Tournament:

References

External links
Gooncha Jawaharlal Nehru Hockey Tournament
 Jawaharlal Nehru Hockey Tournament Society

Sport in New Delhi
Field hockey in Delhi
Recurring sporting events established in 1964
Field hockey cup competitions in India